Cal(l)um MacLeod or Macleod may refer to:
 Calum MacLeod (of Raasay) (1911–1988), crofter
 Calum MacLeod (cricketer) (born 1988), Scotland professional cricketer
 Calum MacLeod (producer) (born 1981), producer and writer
 Calum McLeod (judge) of the Ontario Superior Court
 Calum MacLeod (born 1969), reporter for USA Today, used to be married to Lijia Zhang
 Callum MacLeod (born 1988), British racecar driver
Callum Macleod (TV personality)